The Santa Ana sucker (Catostomus santaanae)  is a freshwater ray-finned fish, endemic to California. It is closely related to the mountain sucker and has dark grey upper parts and silvery underparts. It feeds on algae, diatoms and detritus on the floor of shallow streams with sand, gravel or cobble bottoms. It is found in only a few streams in southern California, and many of these in the Greater Los Angeles metropolitan area have been restricted to concrete channels. Because of its small area of occupancy and vulnerability, the International Union for Conservation of Nature has rated this fish as "endangered".

Description
The Santa Ana sucker is closely related to the mountain sucker, and quite similar in appearance. Color is dark grey above and silvery-white below; the sides have a faint pattern of darker blotches and stripes. There are distinct notches where the upper and lower lips meet, and the lower lip is narrower in the middle, with only 3 or 4 rows of papillae at that point. The dorsal fins have 9 to 11 rays, while the pelvic fins have 8 to 10 rays. These suckers do have an anatomy variation by sex where females have tubercles on caudal peduncle and anal fin while men have an additional tubercles on lower half of caudal peduncle, anal, and caudal fins. The caudal peduncle is somewhat longish. In contrast to the mountain sucker, the membrane between the rays of the tail fin is pigmented.

Also like the mountain sucker, it feeds on diatoms, other kinds of algae, and detritus, which it obtains by scraping surfaces such as rocks. It also eats the occasional insect larva, with larger fish observed to consume insects more frequently.

The breading habits of Santa Ana Suckers do not differ from other species of suckers as the female fish are attended by at least 2 male fishes during mating seasons. A female sucker can release between 4,000 and 16,000 eggs amongst her gradual breeding process.

Their living patterns consist of being a nonmigrant species that are short-lived with around 4 years of time, on average.

Habitat
Santa Ana Suckers live in small to medium size streams throughout the year in Southern California. They notably thrive in freshwater conditions. The depths go from a few centimeters to over 1 m (3 ft 3 in). The rivers they swim in are at a cool temperature (average of <22 °C), with variable flow as they are well-adapted to survive in the most-intense flood conditions. Not surprisingly, given their feeding method, they prefer gravel, rubble, and boulder substrates. In 2010, USF&WS issued an expanded CH determination for the Santa Ana Sucker. 75 Federal Register 77962 (December 14, 2010).

Range
The Catostomus santaanae range is extremely restricted; they are native only to the Los Angeles, San Gabriel, Santa Ana, and Santa Clara River systems in Southern California. Populations have been lost from several parts of the rivers, so that they now only live in Big Tujunga Creek in the Los Angeles River Basin, the headwaters of the San Gabriel River in the San Gabriel Mountains in Angeles National Forest in Los Angeles County, parts of the Santa Clara River system in Los Angeles and Ventura counties, and the lower part of the Santa Ana River in Orange County, especially areas with additional water effluent from sewage treatment plants. A substantial fish population can also be found in a research-monitored project in Los Angeles County of Haines Creek.

Conservation
Since Santa Ana Suckers have been enlisted as an endangered species (April 2000), the Santa Ana Watershed Project Authority has been actively working towards conservation efforts through direct administrative action and educational opportunities for the public to become aware of. Watershed conservation efforts are key in saving these suckers as their biggest threat posed is of habitat lose where it is recorded that they currently have lost over 95% of their natural habitat.

Although some stretches of the rivers are 'wild' and protected by being within the Angeles National Forest area of the San Gabriel Mountains, the coincidence of this fish's range and the Greater Los Angeles metropolitan area, and flowing in concrete lined flood control channels, means that it is a species vulnerable to extinction. The International Union for Conservation of Nature has rated this fish as an "endangered species" because of its decreasing area of occupancy and declining population.

References

 
 Peter B. Moyle, Inland Fishes of California (University of California Press, 2002), pp. 182–185
 

santaanae
Endemic fauna of California
Fish of the Western United States
Santa Ana River
ESA threatened species
Fish described in 1908